Richard II (died 28 August 1026), called the Good (French: Le Bon), was the duke of Normandy from 996 until 1026.

Life
Richard was the eldest surviving son and heir of Richard the Fearless and Gunnor. He succeeded his father as the ruler of Normandy in 996. During his minority, the first five years of his reign, his regent was Count Rodulf of Ivry, his uncle, who wielded the power and put down a peasant insurrection at the beginning of Richard's reign.

Richard had deep religious interests and found he had much in common with King Robert II of France, who he helped militarily against the Duchy of Burgundy. He forged a marriage alliance with Duke Geoffrey I of Brittany by marrying his sister Hawise to him and by his own marriage to Geoffrey's sister Judith.

By 1000, Vikings had begun raiding England again, where they would subsequently cross the channel to Normandy and sell their plunder. Richard provided the Vikings with sanctuary and even welcomed them. This act violated a treaty signed between his father Richard I and King Ethelred II of England, in which he agreed not to aid enemies of England following similar events of assisting the Danes. As a result, Richard was forced to repel an English attack on the Cotentin Peninsula that was led by Ethelred. Ethelred had given orders that Richard be captured, bound and brought to England. But the English had not been prepared for the rapid response of the Norman cavalry and were utterly defeated.

Richard attempted to improve relations with England through his sister Emma's marriage to King Ethelred. This marriage was significant in that it later gave his grandson, William the Conqueror, the basis of his claim to the throne of England. Emma with her two sons Edward and Alfred fled to Normandy followed shortly thereafter by her husband King Ethelred. Soon after the death of Ethelred, Cnut the Great forced Emma to marry him while Richard was forced to recognize the new regime as his sister was again queen. Richard had contacts with Scandinavian Vikings throughout his reign. He employed Viking mercenaries and concluded a treaty with Sweyn Forkbeard who was en route to England.

By 1013, following the St Brice's Day Massacre ordered by Ethelred, King Sweyn Forkbeard of Denmark summoned an army to exact revenge on the English and sailed for England. He stopped in Rouen and was well received and treated courteously by Richard, who concluded an alliance with him.

Richard II commissioned his clerk and confessor, Dudo of Saint-Quentin, to portray his ducal ancestors as morally upright Christian leaders who built Normandy despite the treachery of their overlords and neighboring principalities. It was clearly a work of propaganda designed to legitimize the Norman settlement, and while it contains numerous historically unreliable legends, as respects the reigns of his father and grandfather, Richard I and William I it is considered basically reliable.

In 1025 and 1026 Richard confirmed gifts of his great-grandfather Rollo to Saint-Ouen at Rouen. His other numerous grants to monastic houses tends to indicate the areas over which Richard had ducal control, namely Caen, the Éverecin, the Cotentin, the Pays de Caux and Rouen.

Richard II died in 1026. His eldest son, Richard III, became the new duke.

Marriages and children
Richard married firstly, c.1000, Judith (982–1017), daughter of Conan I of Brittany, by whom he had the following issue:

Richard III (c. 1002/4), duke of Normandy
Alice (c. 1003/5), married Count Reginald I of Burgundy
Robert (c. 1005/7), duke of Normandy
William (c. 1007/9), monk at Fécamp, d. 1025, buried at Fécamp Abbey
Eleanor (c. 1011/3), married to Count Baldwin IV of Flanders
Matilda (c. 1013/5), nun at Fecamp, d. 1033.

With his second wife, Poppa of Envermeu, Richard had the following issue:
Mauger (c. 1019), archbishop of Rouen
William (c. 1020/5), count of Arques

References

Sources

1026 deaths
Dukes of Normandy
10th-century rulers in Europe
11th-century rulers in Europe
Viking Age in France
House of Normandy